Viliami Lolohea (born 4 July 1993) is a New Zealand rugby union player who plays in the wing position. He currently plays for Tonga.

Early and provincial career

Unfortunately, injury ended his season before it had begun and he had to start his climb to the top once more. After a season of playing club rugby in the Nelson Bays area, Lolohea made the Tasman Makos squad for the 2015 ITM Cup. He made 8 appearances and scored 3 tries in the competition.

Super Rugby career

Lolohea was selected as a member of the first ever Sunwolves squad ahead of the 2016 Super Rugby season and played in 4 matches during their debut campaign

Super Rugby statistics

References

1993 births
Living people
New Zealand rugby union players
Rugby union wings
Sunwolves players
New Zealand expatriate rugby union players
New Zealand expatriate sportspeople in Japan
Expatriate rugby union players in Japan
Tonga international rugby union players
Tasman rugby union players